Hughes Dubois (born 1957) is a photographer specialized in the photography of artworks.

His "photographic gaze", in the words of Danièle Gillemon, produced by a combination of staging and lighting of objects, has influenced the form of photography in many museums, institutions, art galleries and private collections.

Parallel to his career in artwork photography, Dubois has developed his own artistic practice, with works appearing in galleries and art books. Over his career spanning 40 years, his ongoing goal has been to demonstrate the great sensitivity of both tribal and classical arts.

Biography 
Dubois was born in Tournai, Belgium and took up photography at the age of twelve, taking photographs of landscapes and strangers in the street. He began his artistic training at the Écoles Supérieures des Arts Saint-Luc (Mons, Belgium) then embarked on architectural studies at the École Saint-Luc (Brussels, Belgium), before switching to study photography in Ath (Belgium).

In 1977, Dubois started his professional career as an advertising photographer at the Studio Asselberghs (Belgium). In 1978, he developed a passion for photographing art after seeing his first Hemba statuette.

Photography of artworks 
In 1982, he set off on a voyage across the Americas with Émile Deletaille to produce several publications on pre-Columbian arts. In 1984, he met Michel Leveau, founder of the Musée Dapper in Paris, for whom he has produced thirty plus publications on African tribal arts.

In 1999, he was contacted by Jacques Kerchache in relation to his project to create the Musée du Quai Branly. Dubois photographed the works presented in the Pavillon des Sessions as an initiative to bring the tribal arts back to the Louvre. «Sculptures» would be the first work to be published by the Musée du Quai Branly, followed by others. In 2003, Dubois set up, in collaboration with Tibet specialist Amy Heller, an iconographic collection of the arts of the peoples of Himalaya for the Art Institute of Chicago. This project would lead to the publication of the book Himalayas – An Aesthetic Adventure.

In 2012, he worked for the Museum of Islamic Art, Doha, taking photographs for a book presenting the Doha masterpieces at the Musée du Louvre as part of the From Cordova to Samarkand exhibition. In 2013, for the opening of the Department of Islamic Art at the Musée du Louvre, Lebanese artist Walid Raad's exhibition featured works produced from photographs of Islamic artworks taken by Hughes Dubois. On this occasion, the Louvre Museum and the artist published Préface à la troisième édition.

Dubois has collaborated with numerous museums including: AfricaMuseum - Royal Museum for Central Africa (Brussels, Belgium), Musée du Quai Branly - Jacques Chirac (Paris, France), Art Institute of Chicago, King Baudouin Foundation (Belgium), Fondation Dapper (Paris, France), Baur Foundation – Museum of Far Eastern Art (Geneva, Switzerland), Guimet Museum (Paris, France), Le Louvre (Paris, France), Musée des arts décoratifs (Paris, France), Museum of Islamic Art, Doha (Doha, Qatar), Beyeler Foundation (Switzerland), The Al-Mansouria Foundation For Culture and Creativity (Saudi Arabia) and other art collections all over the world.

Artistic work 
In 2004, the exhibition Le Sensible et La Force was held at the AfricaMuseum - Royal Museum for Central Africa (Brussels, Belgium) and an eponymous portfolio of 24 silver prints was published in a 12-copy edition. This body of work consisted in «extracting the portraits» of statues by showing their sensitivity and humanity, in order to underline their power and beauty.

In 2013, Formes et Façons was shown at the Val de Bagnes Museum and the Mauvoisin Dam (Switzerland).

From 2013 to 2017, Dubois worked on Borobudur Under the Full Moon, a photographic project undertaken with his wife Caroline Leloup Dubois, which took three years — and over 110 nights — to shoot the world's biggest Buddhist temple, Borobudur (Indonesia). Since 2018, Borobudur Under the Full Moon has toured as a travelling exhibition under the patronage of UNESCO. A limited edition of 9 copies of an eponymous portfolio in platinum palladium and an art book were published on this occasion.

Awards and recognition 
In 2014, the Bismarck Archipelago Art catalogue was awarded the International Tribal Art Book Prize – the ICMA Award and the Best Photography Prize of the MGA Book Award.

Exhibitions 
Since 1982, Dubois’ work has been shown in personal and group exhibitions.

Personal exhibitions 

 1981: Voyage - Maison culturelle de la Tour Burbant, Ath, Belgium
 1982: Ath, ses gens, son cortège - Maison culturelle de la Tour Burbant, Ath, Belgium
 1986: Ouverture sur les arts africains - Musée Dapper, Paris
 2004: Le sensible & La force - AfricaMuseum - Musée royal de l'Afrique centrale de Tervuren, Belgium
 2006: Evelyne Lepage Gallery, Belgium
 2008: Biennale des antiquaires, Paris, Galerie 54, France
 2008: Biennale des antiquaires, Paris - Galerie Bernard Dulon, France
 2010: Collection Durand-Dessert - Monnaie de Paris, France
 2013: Formes & Façons – Musée de Bagne, Verbier, Switzerland
 2013: Monvoisin Dam, Switzerland
 2015: Hughes Dubois: 35 year career in photography - Parcours des Mondes, Paris
 2022: Hughes Dubois, sculpteur d’ombres et de lumières – Galerie Origines – Rencontres internationales de la photographie, Arles, France

Exhibitions of Caroline & Hughes Dubois 

 2018: Borobudur Joyau de l'art bouddhique, Baur Museum, Geneva, Switzerland
 2018: Borobudur Under The Full Moon, Cedart Gallery, Geneva, Switzerland
 2018: Borobudur Under The Full Moon, Musée départemental d'art religieux de Sées, France
 2018: Borobudur Under The Full Moon, Mairie du 1er arrondissement de Paris(1st district town hall), France
 2018: Borobudur Under The Full Moon, Ubud Writers & Readers Festival, Indonesia
 2019: Bouddha La légende dorée, Guimet Museum, France

Major group exhibitions 

 1997: État de sièges - Galerie Voutât, Geneva, Suisse
 2006: Galerie Forêt Verte - Paris
 2014: Primitivisme dans la photographie - Galerie Valois, Paris
 2018: Wormholes 1, Galerie Laure Roynette, Paris
 2018: Wormholes 2, La Ruche, Paris

Collections 
Dubois' photographs have joined public and private collections all over the world.

 AfricaMuseum - Musée royal de l'Afrique centrale de Tervuren (Belgium)
 Al-Mansouria Foundation (Saudi Arabia)
 Art Institute Of Chicago (USA)
 Baur Foundation (Switzerland)
 Musée BELvue (Belgium)
 Beyeler Foundation (Switzerland)
 Dapper Foundation (France)
 King Baudouin Foundation (Belgium)
 Hergé Foundation (Belgium)
 Le Louvre (France)
 Musée des Arts décoratifs (France)
 Museum Of Islamic Art (Qatar)
 Guimet Museum (France)
 Novartis (Switzerland)
 Musée du Quai Branly - Jacques Chirac (France)

Publications 

 
 
 
 
 
 
 
 
 
 
 
 

 
 
 
 
 
 
 
 
 
 
 .

References 

Belgian photographers
Living people
1957 births
Artists from Tournai